Inglis Street is a street on the Halifax Peninsula in the Halifax Regional Municipality Nova Scotia, Canada. It runs between Barrington Street and Beaufort Avenue.  It forms the northern boundary of the campus of Saint Mary's University.

Major intersections
 Beaufort Avenue
 Robie Street
 Barrington Street
 Tower Road
 South Park Street
 Young Avenue

Notable places
 Saint Mary's University
 Inglis Street Elementary School 

Roads in Halifax, Nova Scotia